The 1948 United States presidential election in California took place on November 2, 1948 as part of the 1948 United States presidential election. State voters chose 25 representatives, or electors, to the Electoral College, who voted for president and vice president.

California narrowly voted for the Democratic incumbent, Harry Truman, over the Republican challenger, New York Governor Thomas E. Dewey, even though Dewey's running mate was incumbent Governor Earl Warren. California was the tipping-point state for Truman's victory.

Results

Results by county

References

California
1948
1948 California elections